Jub Kabud-e Olya (also Romanized as Jūb Kabūd-e ‘Olyā, and Joob Kaboodé Olya; also known as Jow Kabūd-e Bālā, Jūb Kabūd, and Jūb Kabūd-e Bālā) is a village in Satar Rural District, Kolyai District, Sonqor County, Kermanshah Province, Iran. At the 2006 census, its population was 208, in 61 families.

References 

Populated places in Sonqor County